Team Sonic may refer to:

 Team name in Sega's video game Sonic Heroes
 Second-party video game developer at Sega, previously known as Sonic Co. and Sonic Software Planning, and merged with Camelot Software Planning after finishing Shining Force III